The Clarence Sondern House is a historic residence located at 3600 Belleview Ave in the Roanoke neighborhood of Kansas City, Missouri. It is also known as the Sondern-Adler House.

History
Clarence Sondern commissioned Frank Lloyd Wright to design the home in 1939, and it was constructed in 1940. The Sondern House is a single level with a flat roof in Wright's classic Usonian style. Using a 4-foot X 4-foot grid (1.2 m) excised onto concrete floors, its masonry sections provide the support for many walls of glass. There are long overhangs on many portions of the house and a carport for the family's vehicle. This was the first home on which Taliesin Fellowship member John H. "Jack" Howe supervised the construction.

The second owner of the home, Arnold Adler, hired Wright in 1948 to design an addition to the original structure. The addition included a new entry area, additional carports, a large dining room, and a living area with fireplace. Since the home was built near a hill, the expanded living room was built a few steps down from the rest of the house, allowing for a higher ceiling and clerestory windows. The addition continued the use of tidewater cypress for the exterior and interior woodwork.

The famous American painter, Thomas Hart Benton, lived in the house just next door to the Sondern House. While working for Sondern, Wright offered to tear down the "rat trap" of a stable at the rear of Benton property and design a good studio for Benton in its place.

The house was sold through "Heritage Auctions" in August 2019 for USD$920,000.

References

 Storrer, William Allin. The Frank Lloyd Wright Companion. University Of Chicago Press, 2006,  (S.279 & S.307)

Frank Lloyd Wright buildings
Houses in Kansas City, Missouri
Houses completed in 1948
Houses completed in 1940